Craugastor rayo, also known as the Sabana robber frog, is a species of frog in the family Craugastoridae. It is endemic to the Cordillera de Talamanca, Costa Rica.

Etymology
The specific name rayo is an "arbitrary combination of letters that happens to mean lightning in Spanish".

Description
Adult males measure  and females  in snout–vent length. The fingers have well-developed lateral fringes whereas the toes are basally webbed. The base color is deep bluish purple in males and slightly lighter and tending toward tan in females. Dorsal patterning is variable and may involve blotches or a mid-dorsal stripe, while some individuals are uniform in color. Limbs may be uniform or
have dark, broad crossbars.

Habitat and conservation
It is threatened by habitat loss, and possibly, chytridiomycosis.

References

rayo
Endemic fauna of Costa Rica
Amphibians of Costa Rica
Amphibians described in 1979
Taxa named by Jay M. Savage
Taxonomy articles created by Polbot